The great rosefinch (Carpodacus rubicilla) is a species of finch in the family Fringillidae. It is found in Afghanistan, Azerbaijan, Georgia, Iran, Kazakhstan, Kyrgyzstan, Mongolia, Pakistan, Russia, Tajikistan, and Uzbekistan and east to China.  Its natural habitats are tundra and temperate grassland.

While past taxonomies treated C. r. severtzovi and two other subspecies as a separate species, the spotted great rosefinch (and called the nominate subspecies the "Caucasian great rosefinch"), they now usually considered subspecies of the great rosefinch.

Four subspecies are recognised:
C. r. rubicilla (Caucasian great rosefinch) - (Güldenstädt, 1775) - central and eastern Caucasus Mountains
 C. r. diabolicus - (Koelz, 1939) - northeastern Afghanistan and Tajikistan
 C. r. kobdensis - (Sushkin, 1925) - southern Siberia, western Mongolia and northwestern China
C. r. severtzovi (spotted great rosefinch) - Sharpe, 1886 - eastern Kazakhstan to central China, the Himalayas and northern Pakistan

References

great rosefinch
Birds of Azerbaijan
Birds of Central Asia
Birds of Western China
Birds of Tibet
great rosefinch
great rosefinch
Taxonomy articles created by Polbot